Salt of the Earth is an album by Ricky Skaggs and The Whites, released through Skaggs Family Records on September 25, 2007. In 2008, the album won both a Grammy Award and a Dove Award for Best Southern/Country/Bluegrass album and Bluegrass Album of the Year respectively.

Track listing

 "Love Will Be Enough" (Janis Ian, Paul Overstreet) - 4:35
 "Homesick for Heaven" (Kelly Willard) - 3:35
 "Big Wheel" (Gibson) - 2:46
 "Salt of the Earth" - 3:09
 "Wreck on the Highway" - 3:31
 "Farther Along" (J. R. Baxter) - 4:13
 "Let It Shine" (White) - 3:41
 "Near the Cross" - 3:58
 "One Seed of Love" - 3:23
 "This Old House" (Stuart Hamblen) - 2:43
 "Wings of a Dove" (Bob Ferguson) - 3:55
 "Blessed Assurance" - 3:29
 "The Solid Rock" (Edward Mote) - 3:06

Personnel

Ricky Skaggs & The Whites
Ricky Skaggs - bouzouki, dobro, electric guitar, mandolin, percussion, soloist, vocals
Buck White - mandolin, vocals
Cheryl White - vocals
Sharon White-Skaggs - vocals

Additional musicians
Jim "Moose" Brown - Hammond B-3 organ, piano
Mark Fain - upright bass
Paul Franklin - steel guitar
Cody Kilby - acoustic guitar, soloist
Brent King - percussion
Andy Leftwich - fiddle
Paul Leim - drums, percussion
Molly Skagg s- autoharp
Jeff Taylor - accordion, piano

Chart performance

Awards

In 2008, the album won the Grammy Award for Best Southern/Country/Bluegrass Album at the 50th Grammy Awards. It also won the Dove Award for Bluegrass Album of the Year at the 39th GMA Dove Awards.

References

External links
 Ricky Skaggs' official site
 Salt of the Earth on Amazon.com

2007 albums
Ricky Skaggs albums
The Whites albums